Inishbiggle is a small inhabited island off the coast of Ballycroy in County Mayo.  Its name in Irish means "Vigil Island"

Geography 
The island is situated between the northeast of Achill Island and the mainland, and is accessed by boat from either Doran's point at Ballycroy or Bullsmouth, Dooniver on Achill Island.

Description 
The main activities are sheep and cattle farming, fishing and winkle picking.  Facilities on the island included a school and a post office, both now closed.  

Plans to build a cable-car link across the Bullsmouth Channel, one of the strongest currents in Europe separating the island from Achill had been under discussion since 1996, but have now been abandoned.  Planning permission for the cablecar was denied by Mayo county council on the grounds that "It would be visually obtrusive in an area of special scenic importance, that it would create traffic problems and that it would devalue houses in the vicinity."

Unpredictable currents in the channel during winter months can render the island inaccessible, even though the passage during fair weather is about ten minutes in the traditional boat, the currach. Emergency access is by helicopter.

Demographics 
The table below reports data on Inishbiggle's population taken from Discover the Islands of Ireland (Alex Ritsema, Collins Press, 1999) and the Census of Ireland.

See also
 Nevins
 Potato Labour Scandal 1971
 Ulster Scots dialects

References

External links 
 Discover Ireland - Inishbiggle

Islands of County Mayo